Luke Schoonmaker (born September 28, 1998) is an American football tight end for the Michigan Wolverines.

Early life and high school career
Born in 1998, Schoonmaker played high school football at Hamden Hall Country Day School in Hamden, Connecticut. As a senior, he completed 18 passes, caught 22 passes, and carried as a rusher 34 times and tallied 851 yards in combined passing, receiving and rushing yards. Rated as the top player in Connecticut, he committed to play college football for Michigan in July 2017.

College career
When he enrolled at Michigan, Schoonmaker was six feet, six inches tall and weighed 220 pounds. Training with Michigan strength and conditioning coach Ben Herbert, he increased his weight to 250 pounds. On October 12, 2019, he scored his first collegiate touchdown on a 25-yard pass from Shea Patterson.

As a senior in 2021, Schoonmaker appeared in nine games and caught 17 passes for 165 yards and three touchdowns. He earned a reputation as Michigan's "most reliable blocking tight end and a player who never complained about his touches." After the 2021 season, Schoonmaker received honorable mention All-BIg Ten honors.

In January 2022, with eligibility remaining, Schooonmaker announced that he would return to Michigan as a fifth-year senior.  In July, he was named to the watch list for the Mackey Award. He was also rated by NFL scouts as Michigan's most draftable player among the team's senior players. He is known for his blocking and speed. 

On September 24, Schoonmaker caught a career-high seven passes for 72 yards and a touchdown against Maryland. Against Indiana on October 8, he established another career-high with nine receptions, adding 67 receiving yards and a touchdown. During the 2022 regular season, he ranked second on the team with 31 receptions and third with 330 receiving yards. In December 2022 he accepted an invite to the East–West Shrine Bowl. On January 9, 2023, Schoonmaker announced he would forego his final year of collegiate eligibility and declared for the 2023 NFL Draft.

College statistics

References

External links

 Michigan Wolverines bio

1998 births
Living people
American football tight ends
Michigan Wolverines football players
People from Hamden, Connecticut
Players of American football from Connecticut